is a railway station in Furano, Hokkaido, Japan, operated by the Hokkaido Railway Company (JR Hokkaido). The station is numbered T30.

Lines
Furano Station is served by the following two lines.
Nemuro Main Line
Furano Line

Station layout
The station has a "Midori no Madoguchi" staffed ticket office. Kitaca cannot be used at this station.

History
It was renamed simply Furano Station on 1 April 1942. With the privatization of JNR on 1 April 1987, the station came under the control of JR Hokkaido.

Surrounding area
 National Route 38
 National Route 237
 Furano City Office
 Hokkaido Furano High School
 Hokkaido Furano Ryokuho High School

See also
 List of railway stations in Japan

References

Railway stations in Hokkaido Prefecture
Stations of Hokkaido Railway Company
Railway stations in Japan opened in 1900